That One Word – Feyenoord (Dutch: Dat Ene Woord – Feyenoord)  is a sports documentary series released on Disney+.

Production
In February 2021, Feyenoord and The Walt Disney Company announced the production of a Disney+ series which would see the company producing a documentary about Feyenoord during the 2020–21 season. The series will consist of 8 episodes. In May 2021 Feyenoord announced that the series would be titled Dat ene woord – Feyenoord and would be available from August 27, 2021. It was later announced that the series would be getting a ninth episode, with the release of the first episode being pushed back to September 1.

In October 2021, Lusus Media confirmed that it was in discussions with Feyenoord and Disney about a possible second season of the series, with the first season being deemed a success. If given the go ahead the second season would be following Feyenoord during its 2022–23 season with episodes airing in 2023.

Episodes

Season 1 (2021)

Season 2 (2023)
Disney+ and Lusus Media are in talks for a second season.

References

External links 

Association football documentary television series
Feyenoord
Star (Disney+) original programming